"Just My Type" is a song by British pop rock band The Vamps. The song was released as a digital download on 15 June 2018 through Sony Music Entertainment. It serves as the fourth single from their third studio album Night & Day, being included on the second part of it, called Day Edition.

Music video
A music video to accompany the release of "Just My Type" was first released onto YouTube on 9 July 2018 at a total length of three minutes and thirty-eight seconds. The video shows the band hanging out and spending some time together when a girl catches Brad's eye because she is just his type. Then they start to date and he spends time with her, when, he realizes that she gives him good things and makes him happy, but she can also bring bad things, and as the story keeps going on, this becomes more noticeable. At the end, the whole story goes back to the beginning of the video and he decides to ignore the girl.

Track listing

Charts

Release history

References

 

 

2018 songs
2018 singles
The Vamps (British band) songs
Songs written by Alex James (songwriter)
Songs written by Iain James
Songs written by James Abrahart
Songs written by Jacob Manson